Carl Fredrik Mennander (sometimes modernised as Karl Fredrik Mennander, often just C.F. Mennander) (19 July 1712, Stockholm – 22 May 1786) was Bishop of Turku, Finland, from 1757–1775 and then Archbishop of Uppsala in the Church of Sweden from 1775 to his death.

He arrived as a student at the University of Uppsala in 1731 and got acquainted with the botanist Carl Linnaeus. In 1735 he travelled to Turku, Finland, and finished his education with a Master of Arts. He stayed in Turku for fifteen years, and made several important improvements there within the school system and hospital facilities.

He was ordained priest, and also had a professorship in physics. In 1757 he was consecrated Bishop of Turku. In 1775 he was elected Archbishop of Uppsala by the cathedral chapter and settled in Uppsala.

He became highly engaged in the matters of the Uppsala University and published many disputations, speeches and dissertations. At his death, he had gathered one of the finest book collections of his time. He was a member of the Royal Swedish Academy of Sciences from 1744. Mennander was also a member of Pro Fide et Christianismo, a Christian education society.

See also
 List of Archbishops of Uppsala

References

 Nordisk familjebok (1913), article Mennander
 Sv. biografiskt handlexikon, article Mennander

External links

1712 births
1786 deaths
People from Stockholm
Lutheran archbishops of Uppsala
18th-century Lutheran archbishops
Members of the Royal Swedish Academy of Sciences
Lutheran archbishops and bishops of Turku
Age of Liberty people